The 1989 League of Ireland Cup Final was the final match of the 1989–90 League of Ireland Cup, known as the Opel League Cup for sponsorship purposes, a knock-out association football competition contested annually by clubs affiliated with the League of Ireland. It took place on 9 November 1989 at Oriel Park in Dundalk, and was contested by Dundalk and Derry City. Dundalk won 4–1 in a penalty shoot-out, following a 1–1 draw after extra-time.

Background
The League Cup was the first trophy of the 1989–90 League of Ireland season. The two sides' only previous meeting that season had been a 1–1 draw in the League of Ireland Premier Division. The match was the third time the two sides had met in cup finals in 18 months - Dundalk having defeated Derry in the 1988 FAI Cup Final and Derry having defeated Dundalk in the previous season's League Cup Final. The latter match was the first part of Derry's domestic Treble of League, FAI Cup and League Cup, which they had won the season before – the only team to have done so.

Dundalk had last won the League Cup three seasons earlier in 1986–87. They had won their group in the group-stage, then defeated Athlone Town (3–2), and St Patrick's Athletic (3–1) to reach the 1989 final.

Match

Summary
Dundalk started strongly, and were awarded a 10th-minute penalty. But Joey Malone's spot-kick was saved by Derry goalkeeper, Tim Dalton. Minutes later Derry's Paul Doolin was shown a straight red card by referee John Spillane, after a clash with Dundalk's James Coll. Spillane had also made a number of controversial decisions in Dundalk's defeat of Derry in the 1988 FAI Cup Final. Despite being a man down, Derry took a 36th-minute lead through Felix Healy. Dundalk equalised a minute before half-time when Paul Newe fired a loose ball from a corner to the net. The sides couldn't be separated in the second half or in extra-time, with Derry defending resolutely. But in the resulting penalty shoot-out Derry missed two spot-kicks, while Dundalk scored four to take the victory and the League Cup for the fourth time.

Details

References
Bibliography

Citations

League of Ireland Cup finals
League Of Ireland Cup Final 1989
League Of Ireland Cup Final 1989
League Of Ireland Cup Final